The UEFA Nations League is a biennial international football competition contested by the senior men's national teams of the member associations of UEFA, the sport's European governing body. The first season has begun in September 2018 consisting of four groups in each of the four leagues ranked by UEFA coefficient of each country.
 
France has been on the highest level of the competition, in League A, since the beginning of this tournament. However France has only been part of the Nations League Finals once, in the 2020–21 season, while in the first season, they finished second of their group behind the Netherlands, but ahead of Germany, who was supposed to be relegated, but after changes on the format, stayed in League A. France won the Nations League on the 2020–21 season after winning Group A3, beating Belgium in the semi-finals and beating Spain in the final, making France the first ever European nation to win the World Cup, the European Championship and the Nations League.

UEFA Nations League record

*Draws include knockout matches decided via penalty shoot-out.
**Group stage played home and away. Flag shown represents host nation for the finals stage. Red border colour indicates the finals stage was held on home soil.

List of matches

2018–19 UEFA Nations League

Group stage

2020–21 UEFA Nations League

Group stage

Finals
France qualified for its first appearance to the UEFA Nations League Finals in the 2020–21 season, after defeating Portugal on 14 November 2020.

Semi-finals

Final

2022–23 UEFA Nations League

Group stage

Goalscorers

Bold players are still active with the national team.

References

External links
France at UEFA

Countries at the UEFA Nations League
France national football team